Oliver Antman (born 15 August 2001) is a Finnish footballer who plays as a midfielder for Eredivisie club FC Groningen, on loan from FC Nordsjælland.

Club career

IF Gnistan
Antman joined IF Gnistan from Tikkurilan Palloseura in the winter 2018. Antman was the first player from Gnistan to be sold to a foreign club. He played 7 games for the club and scored one goal before he left (on 20 June 2018 in a 1–1 draw against FC Vaajakoski).

FC Nordsjælland
On 27 September 2018 IF Gnistan announced, that they had sold Antman to FC Nordsjælland for an undisclosed fee that could increase further. The deal was completed on the last day of the summer transfermarket. Antman had earlier already been on a trial at the club and did actually also play an hour for the reserve team of Nordsjælland in May 2018, where he also scored a goal. The reserve team won the game 4-2 and won the reserve team league with that victory.

Antman's first senior experience was on 16 February 2019, where he sat on the bench for the whole game against Hobro IK in the Danish Superliga. He got his official debut for FC Nordsjælland on 30 March 2019 in the first game of newly appointed manager Flemming Pedersen. Antman started on the bench and came on the pitch replacing Mohammed Kudus with three minutes left, in a 0-0 draw against FC Midtjylland in the Danish Superliga.

In February 2019, first team manager Kasper Hjulmand revealed, that many big clubs was chasing Antman before he chose to join FC Nordsjælland. On 20 August 2019, Antman extended his contract with Nordsjælland until June 2024. Two years later, on 6 September 2022, Antman once again signed a new deal, this time until June 2025.

FC Groningen (loan)
On transfer deadline day, 31 January 2023, Antman joined Eredivisie side FC Groningen until the end of the season. On 5 February 2023, Antman scored in his debut for Groningen, after coming off the bench in the 65th minute of a match against FC Twente, replacing Joey Pelupessy. Antman scored Groningen's only goal, four minutes after coming on, in a match that ended 1-1.

Career statistics

Club

International 

Scores and results list Finland's goal tally first, score column indicates score after each Antman goal.

International career

Antman has played matches in Finnish U18, U19 and U21 teams. On 26 September 2022, 21-year old Antman got his debut for the Finnish national team in a 2022–23 UEFA Nations League B game against Montenegro. Antman both scored the 1-0 goal and made the assist to the goal for 2–0.

References

External links
 
 

2001 births
Living people
Finnish footballers
Finnish expatriate footballers
Finland youth international footballers
Finland international footballers
Association football midfielders
Helsingin Jalkapalloklubi players
CF Damm players
IF Gnistan players
FC Nordsjælland players
FC Groningen players
Kakkonen players
Danish Superliga players
Finnish expatriate sportspeople in Spain
Finnish expatriate sportspeople in Denmark
Finnish expatriate sportspeople in the Netherlands
Expatriate footballers in Spain
Expatriate footballers in Denmark
Expatriate footballers in the Netherlands